Product/market fit, also known as product-market fit, is the degree to which a product satisfies a strong market demand.

Product/market fit has been identified as a first step to building a successful venture in which the company meets early adopters, gathers feedback and gauges interest in its product(s).

History

According to Benchmark Capital co-founder Andy Rachleff, Sequoia Capital founder Don Valentine developed the thinking behind product-market fit, but it was Andy who first put a name to it. Venture capitalist Marc Andreessen of Andreessen Horowitz would later popularize the term in the mid-2000's. Andreesen credits Rachleff for the concept, referring to the idea as Rachleff's Corollary of Startup Success: "The only thing that matters is getting to product/market fit."

Marc Andreessen defined the term as follows: “Product/market fit means being in a good market with a product that can satisfy that market.” Many people interpret product/market fit as creating a so called minimum viable product that addresses and solves a problem or need that exists.

Steve Blank referred to the concept of product/market fit as a step in between customer validation (step #2 in his book The Four Steps to the Epiphany) and customer creation (step #3).

Interpretations

Product/market fit might be interpreted in terms of Alexander Osterwalder's Business Model Canvas paradigm as comprising value proposition, customer segment, relationship, and channel. Achieving Product/market fit implies these are set without requiring additional changes or pivots.

Popular metrics

The 40% rule

One metric for product/market fit is if at least 40% percent of surveyed customers indicate that they would be "very disappointed" if they no longer have access to a particular product or service. Alternatively, it could be measured by having at least 40% of surveyed customers considering the product or service as "must have". Sean Ellis is noted for popularizing this heuristic after examining many startups. Rahul Vohra of Superhuman has developed a survey-based model based on the 40% Rule to help post-launch startups test and optimize for this metric.

Analytics metrics

There are five metrics any online business can measure to empirically verify if they achieved product/market fit. They are 1. Bounce Rate, 2. Time on Site, 3. Pages per Visit, 4. Returning Visitors, 5. Customer Lifetime Value. Low bounce rates means a visitor's expectation is being met. High Time on Site and Pages per Visit indicate that the experience of the user is satisfactory. High Returning Visitor reflects the lasting impact a product has on their customers, causing them to come back, and Customer Lifetime Value measures the profitability each customer brings to the company. If these 5 metrics are above average and your 40% rule is met, you'll know you have a product/market fit company.

Common mistakes

It is important to differentiate between product/market fit and problem/solution fit when measuring a company's customer base. More specifically, when gauging a customer's desire, companies need to be sure they are measuring desire for the product or service—not just for a solution. Misinterpreting customers' desire for a solution as desire for a company's product or service will end up being a false positive for product/market fit.

Product/market fit is not binary. For a fledgling startup, a minimum degree of product/market fit will not be adequate in order to achieve market traction and success. Rather, what is actually required is a high degree of product/market fit, or extreme product/market fit.

See also 
 Lean startup
 Customer Churn
 Cohort Analysis
 Revenue stream

References

Product management